Joël Patrick Magnin (born 31 May 1971) is a Swiss former footballer and current manager.

International career
Magnin made 1 appearance for the Switzerland national football team in a 1-0 2002 FIFA World Cup qualification win over the Faroe Islands on 2 June 2001.

Managerial career
A longtime youth coach for Young Boys, Magnin signed a 2-year contract to manage Xamax for the 2019-2020 season.

Honours
Grasshopper
Swiss Super League (3): 1994–95, 1995–96, 1997–98
Swiss Cup (1): 1993–94

References

External links
 
 
 Suisse Legends Profile
 
 Xamax Profile

1971 births
People from Neuchâtel
Swiss men's footballers
Switzerland international footballers
Swiss football managers
Swiss Super League players
BSC Young Boys players
FC Lugano players
Grasshopper Club Zürich players
Neuchâtel Xamax FCS managers
Association football midfielders
Living people
Sportspeople from the canton of Neuchâtel